Carsten Ball and Travis Rettenmaier were the defending champions, however only Ball tried to defend his title.
He partnered with Kaes Van't Hof, but they lost to Rik de Voest and Scott Lipsky 6–7(2), 4–6 in the final.

Seeds

Draw

Draw

References
 Doubles Draw
 Qualifying Draw

Doubles